Giuseppe Garlato (22 December 1896 – 5 September 1988) is an Italian engineer and politician who served as Mayor of Pordenone (1946–1956), member of the Constituent Assembly (1946–1948), Deputy (1948–1958), Senator (1958–1968), and Undersecretary of State (1959–1962).

References

1896 births
1988 deaths
Mayors of Pordenone
Christian Democracy (Italy) politicians
Members of the Constituent Assembly of Italy
Deputies of Legislature I of Italy
Deputies of Legislature II of Italy
Senators of Legislature III of Italy
Senators of Legislature IV of Italy
People from San Vito al Tagliamento